Alansky District, known until 1931 as Psedakhsky Okrug, and until 1944 as Psedakhsky District, was an administrative-territorial unit part of the Ingush and Checheno-Ingush Autonomous Oblasts, and the Checheno Ingush and later North Ossetian ASSRs, which existed from 1926 to 1955. The administrative center was the village of Psedakh, which was renamed in 1944 as Alanskoe following the Deportation of the Chechens and Ingush. For a small amount on time, on January 23, 1936, the district was abolished, but on February 25 of the same year it was restored. In 1955 the district was abolished and its territory was merged into Malgobeksky District.

References 

Districts of Ingushetia